Meron may refer to:

People
 Meron (surname), including a list of people with the name
 Meron Abraham (born 1995), an Eritrean cyclist
 Meron Amanuel (born 1990), an Eritrean cyclist
 Meron Benvenisti (born 1934), an Israeli political scientist
 Meron Getnet (fl. from 2013), an Ethiopian actress, journalist and political activist
 Meron Gribetz (fl. from 2013), an Israeli technology entrepreneur
 Meron Mazur (born 1962), a Ukrainian Catholic bishop
 Meron Russom (born 1987), an Eritrean cyclist 
 Meron Teshome (born 1992), an Eritrean cyclist

Other uses
 Meron (physics) or half-instanton, a Euclidean space-time solution of the Yang–Mills field equations
 Meron, Israel, a town
 Mount Meron, a mountain 
 Meron School, in Tel Aviv, Israel
 Meron, part of an insect's leg in insect morphology

See also